Blowick railway station was on the Manchester and Southport Railway in the Blowick suburb of Southport, Merseyside. Situated on a level crossing on Meols Cop Road (B5276), the station opened as Cop End in early 1871, and was renamed Blowick on 1 October 1871. The station closed on 25 September 1939, and this section of the line closed on 14 June 1965, forcing trains to divert through  on a section of the old Liverpool, Southport and Preston Junction Railway.

References 

Disused railway stations in the Metropolitan Borough of Sefton
Former Lancashire and Yorkshire Railway stations
Railway stations in Great Britain opened in 1871
Railway stations in Great Britain closed in 1939
Buildings and structures in Southport